The Laserjet 2300 series was a line of grayscale laser printers sold by Hewlett-Packard. The printer was aimed at small and medium business use. The printer utilizes the DRAM memory technology and a packs 32 MB standard memory, which is expandable to 288 MB. It is compatible with Microsoft Windows and Macintosh Operating System.

Variations 
The 2300 Series came in several configurations and variations:

 LaserJet 2300
Standard model.

 LaserJet 2300d
Able to perform automatic duplex printing.

 Laserjet 2300n
Fitted with a 10/100 Ethernet port, for networking.

 Laserjet 2300dn
Able to duplex automatically and was fitted with a 10/100 ethernet port.

 LaserJet 2300L
A lower cost version with a lower print speed of 20 pages per minute.

LaserJet 2300dtn
A combination of the 2300d, 2300n, and with a third tray as standard.

Computer Operating System 

 Microsoft Windows Millennium Edition
 Unix, Microsoft Windows 2000
 Microsoft Windows 95
 Ibm Os/2 
 Microsoft Windows NT
 Microsoft Windows 98
 Linux
 Microsoft Windows XP Professional
 Apple Mac OS 8
 Microsoft Windows XP Home
 Apple Mac OS 9
 Apple Mac Os X

References

2300 series